Whirl Away is a book written by award winning Canadian writer Russell Wangersky, first published in March 2012, by Thomas Allen Publishers. In the book, the author compiles a collection of short stories that examine "what happens when people's personal coping skills go awry."

Awards and honours
Whirl Away received shortlist honours for the 2012 Scotiabank Giller Prize, and won the 2013 Thomas Head Raddall Award.

References

External links
Russell Wangersky

Canadian short story collections
2012 short story collections
Thomas Allen Publishers books